Rear Admiral Thomas T. Matteson (born June 15, 1935) was appointed Superintendent of the United States Merchant Marine Academy in the summer of 1993 and served in that position until his retirement in August 1998. Matteson had served as superintendent of the United States Coast Guard Academy from June 1989, prior to taking over as superintendent of the Merchant Marine Academy.

Childhood home and education
Matteson is a native of Upper Sandusky, Ohio, and graduated from the Coast Guard Academy in 1957. Matteson subsequently received a master's degree in management science from the Naval Postgraduate School and later in 1977 graduated from the Air War College.

Other billets
 
Thomas T. Matteson's first Coast Guard assignment was on the USCGC Castle Rock (WAVP-383), then, the cutter WHEC-383 (pictured at left), which was serving in the Atlantic Ocean. Later a USCG aviator and helicopter pilot, Matteson then entered flight training in 1961 at the Naval Air Station, Pensacola, Florida. His subsequent assignments included postings at Coast Guard air stations in Miami, Port Angeles, Washington, and Puerto Rico, before being named chief of staff for the Eighth Coast Guard District, New Orleans in 1984.

Decorations and awards
Thomas T. Matteson's decorations, awards and other honors include the Legion of Merit, the Meritorious Service Medal, and the NAACP's Roy Wilkins Renown Service Award.

References

United States Merchant Marine Academy superintendents
United States Coast Guard admirals
United States Coast Guard Academy alumni
Living people
Recipients of the Legion of Merit
1935 births
People from Upper Sandusky, Ohio